Several ships have been named  :

 , the lead ship of her class of the Imperial Japanese Navy; renamed  and re-rated as a minesweeper in June 1930; demilitarized in November 1940
 JDS Nara (PF-2, PF-282), a Kusu-class patrol frigate of the Japan Maritime Self-Defense Force, formerly USS Machias (PF-53)

See also 
 Nara (disambiguation)

Imperial Japanese Navy ship names
Japanese Navy ship names